This is a list of Ministers of Culture of Russia.

Russian SFSR

Ministers of Culture (1953–1992)

Russian Federation

Minister of Culture and Tourism (1992)

Ministers of Culture (1992–2004)

Minister of Culture and Mass Media (2004–2008)

Ministers of Culture (since 2008)

References

External links
Ministry of Culture official website

Culture
Russia
Lists of government ministers of Russia
Lists of government ministers of the Soviet Union